Asmus v. Pacific Bell, 23 Cal.4th 1 (2000) is a US labor law case, concerning the scope of federal preemption against state law for labor rights.

Facts
In 1986, Pacific Bell's "Management Employment Security Policy" stated it would ensure its staff has a right to be reassigned to different jobs and retrained if their existing jobs were eliminated. But in 1990 it withdrew this right. Sixty management employees claimed this withdrawal was unlawful.

Judgment
The California Supreme Court (Chin J giving judgment, Baxter J, Brown J and Haller J concurring) held an employment policy promising long term job security to a firm's managers can be modified if (1) the policy is one of 'indefinite duration' (2) the policy is in effect for a 'reasonable time' (3) 'reasonable notice' was given for a change, and (4) no 'vested benefits' are affected by the change.

George CJ dissented. Mosk J and Kennard J concurred in the dissent.

See also

United States labor law

Notes

References

United States labor case law